Roberto Soldà (born May 28, 1959 in Valdagno) is an Italian professional football coach and a former player.

External links

1959 births
Living people
Italian footballers
Serie A players
Serie B players
Ravenna F.C. players
Como 1907 players
Atalanta B.C. players
Juventus F.C. players
Hellas Verona F.C. players
S.S. Lazio players
A.C. Monza players
Italian football managers
Sportspeople from the Province of Vicenza
A.C. Montichiari managers
FC Chiasso managers
Association football defenders
Footballers from Veneto